Den nye lensmannen (The New Sheriff) is a 1926 Norwegian drama film directed by Leif Sinding, starring Haakon Hjelde. The new sheriff (lensmann) hides a secret: he is actually a gypsy (tater). He tricks money from the locals, but he also helps two lovers unite.

Cast

Haakon Hjelde as Franz Joseph, a Gypsy
Anna-Brita Ryding as Ragnhild Knutsdatter Øvrebø
Ulf Selmer as Knut Øverbø, a wealthy farmer
Einar Rose as Per Storflaten
Martin Linge as Ola, a servant boy at the Øvrebø farm
Ragnvald Wingar as Jens Brødlaus, a smallholder
Marie Hedemark as Berthe Brødlaus, Jens's wife
Mally Haaland as Signors Brødlaus, their daughter
Ranveig Aasgaard as Marit, a servant girl
Ellen Astrup as the hulder
Helga Rydland as an elderly Gypsy woman
Robert Sperati as the burial mound farmer
Ellen Sinding as a dancer
Maina Claes as a dancer

External links
 
 

1926 films
1926 drama films
Films directed by Leif Sinding
Norwegian silent feature films
Norwegian black-and-white films
Norwegian drama films
Silent drama films

no: